XHUAL-FM is a radio station serving Torreón, Coahuila owned by the Universidad Autónoma de La Laguna. It is branded as Frecuencia UAL and broadcasts on 98.7 FM from its campus.

XHUAL was the first of the four university radio stations that currently serve the Comarca Lagunera, receiving its permit in 2005.

References

External links
Frecuencia UAL 98.7 Facebook

Radio stations in Coahuila
Mass media in Torreón
University radio stations in Mexico
Radio stations in the Comarca Lagunera